Computer Laboratory or Computing Laboratory may refer to:
 A computer lab, a room containing one shared mainframe or multiple workstations for an organisation or community.
 The Department of Computer Science and Technology at the University of Cambridge, formerly the Computer Laboratory
 The Department of Computer Science, at the University of Oxford, formerly the Computing Laboratory